St. Mary's General Hospital is a 147-bed adult acute-care facility in Kitchener, Ontario, Canada serving Waterloo Region and surrounding area. St. Mary’s is the second-largest acute care hospital in the St. Joseph’s Health System. It is the site of the Regional Cardiac Care Centre, which opened in 2003. The emergency department was extensively renovated in 2004. St Mary’s hospital’s clinical focuses are on cardiac care, respiratory care, outpatient (day) surgery, general medicine, and 24/7 emergency care. Around 2,000 staff, physicians’ volunteers provide care in these areas of the hospital. Patients who can not be taken care of at St. Mary’s will most likely be transferred to Grand River General Hospital.

History 
St. Mary's Hospital was founded by the Sisters of St. Joseph of Hamilton. St. Mary’s Hospital is linked to the St. Mary’s Roman Catholic Church in Kitchener. The church was founded in 1856 to provide spiritual services to Roman Catholic families in the area who were mainly German immigrants. The two pastors at the time, the Very Reverend Albert L. Zinger (1874 – 1948), and Reverend Anthony J. Fisher (1874 – 1939) knew there was a need for an enlargement of the current Kitchener-Waterloo Hospital and a Catholic hospital would be a good fit as there was a growing Catholic community.

Construction began in 1923 and the doors opened on 1924-10-21. The Sisters of St. Joseph of Hamilton committed $350,000 to helping the build and opening of the hospital and the Catholic congregations of Kitchener and Waterloo had donated $100,000. The last $50,000 was donated, by the residents of the Twin Cities. This cost would help secure 100 beds in the hospital as only 70 beds were currently available at the Kitchener-Waterloo hospital. The first patient at St. Mary’s hospital was Mr. Edward Markie. Mr. Markie came to the hospital with an inflamed appendix. He was admitted to the hospital where Dr. Harry M. Lackner performed the appendectomy which was also the first surgery that was performed at the hospital. The first x-ray machine was also used by Dr. John Hett and the x-ray machine was the first one available to all physicians who worked in the region. After the first 10 days of operation, the hospital had treated thirty-one patients for a variety of medical problems. Patients did not have to be Catholic in order to be treated at the hospital. 

From the beginning, a nursing school was part of the facility. General was added to its name in 1959. A major expansion between 1959 and 1962 saw the hospital grow from 123 beds to 354. The expansion of the hospital in 1960 added a new 10-storey tower. Most of the existing hospital was replaced with the new expansion. The remaining part of the building now houses the administrative offices. This part of the building used to be the nurses’ residence. The expanded facility included an emergency department and an intensive care unit. The nursing school was closed, with training moved to Conestoga College. In 1989, activities at St. Mary's were coordinated with those at the Grand River Hospital, and St. Mary's began to specialize in adult care. St. Mary’s hospital is considered to be the leader in national safety measures. This brings true to their visions to be the safest and more effective hospital in Canada. They have twice earned a top score in the report and are one of three centres in Canada performing better than the national average. A 7 year expansion project was announced in 2020. The project will cost a total of $13 million and that funding is coming from both the government and donors. The hope with the expansion is so that the hospital can perform ablation procedures which studies the rhythm of the heart. Patients will no longer have to travel to London, Hamilton or Toronto to have the procedure performed.

In October 2018, Dr. Andrew Falconer was named president of St. Marys and St. Joseph’s Health System. With a staff of 1,300; this role was to commence in February 2019. Previously, Dr. Falconer was a vice president and chief of staff at Queensway Carleton Hospital in Ottawa. He replaced Don Shilton, who retired in June 2018. In May 2019, however, the hospital announced that Dr. Falconer would returning to Queensway Carleton as President and Chief Executive Officer, requiring a search for a new president of St. Mary's. The current president of the hospital is Ms. Lee Fairclough. Ms. Fairclough started working as the president of the hospital on January 6, 2020. She was appointed to this position by the St. Mary’s board of trustees after a national search for a new president.

The St. Mary’s General Hospital Foundation is a non-for-profit organization that helps to provide funding for the hospital so it can provide equipment and programs for the patients. Around $5 million in donations from donors is expected to be given to the foundation every year as Government funding does not cover all of the costs for replacement and enhancement of equipment. Over the past 10 years, over $50 million has been donated to the hospital through the foundation.

References

External links
 Official hospital site

Hospital buildings completed in 1924
Hospital buildings completed in 1962
Saint Mary's General Hospital
Hospitals established in 1924
Christian hospitals